These are lists of places by eponym, i.e. lists grouping places named after the same person.

Abu Bakar of Johor
Benjamin Franklin
C. N. Annadurai
Charles de Gaulle
Christopher Columbus
DeWitt Clinton
Douglas MacArthur
Francis Marion
Franjo Tuđman
George S. Patton
Heracles
Israel Putnam
John C. Calhoun
John Marshall
Joseph Stalin
Josip Broz Tito
José Rizal
Joyce Kilmer
Lewis Cass
Mallory
Marquis de Lafayette
Nathanael Greene
Pierre Brossolette
Prince Marko
Queen Victoria
Richard Montgomery
Robert Byrd
Sam Houston
Simón Bolívar
Tadeusz Kościuszko
Vladimir Lenin
Popes
Pope Francis
Pope John Paul II
Presidents of the United States
Dwight D. Eisenhower
Andrew Jackson
Thomas Jefferson
James Madison
James Monroe
James K. Polk
George Washington

Places